Haghi is a surname. Notable people with the surname include:

Alireza Haghi (born 1979), Iranian cyclist
Davoud Haghi (born 1981), Iranian footballer